Barishal Airport  is a domestic airport located in the southern city of Barisal in Bangladesh. GMG Airlines, Royal Bengal Airlines and United Airways previously operated flights to Dhaka from this airport. In April 2015, the national carrier Biman Bangladesh Airlines resumed weekly flights after nine years.

Location
The airport is located close to Barisal city in Rahamatpur area of Babuganj Upazila.

History
Before it was re-constructed, there was a huge demand for an airport in the region, for quicker travel to capital Dhaka. Local organisations held many strikes and demonstrations for its construction. The airport was finally built in 1985 on 163 acres of land, at cost of BDT 4 million. It was officially inaugurated by the then president Abdur Rahman Biswas on 3 December 1995. Aero Bengal Airlines, a private airline, was the first airline to launch flights to the airport. National carrier, Biman started their services in November 1995.

In 2007, the airport played a significant role during the relief operation in the aftermath of Cyclone Sidr in November 2007, thus virtually saving thousands of lives of the cyclone affected people. International relief materials like drinking water, rice, blankets and other life saving materials were possible to send to the devastated victims of the cyclone with the help of the airport.

Statistics
The airport has served  passengers between 1995 and 2009. Over 20,000 flights including passengers, training, cargo and other flights had operated from the airport. The airport saw highest number of passengers in 1999 and highest number of flights in the year 2000.

Airlines and destinations

See also
 List of airports in Bangladesh

References

External links
 Civil Aviation Authority of Bangladesh: Airports

Airports in Bangladesh
Barisal